The Diplomatic Quarter is a building that houses most of Taiwan's foreign embassies, as well as the headquarters of the International Cooperation and Development Fund (TaiwanICDF). It is located in the Tianmu neighbourhood of Shilin District in the capital Taipei.

Additionally, the term may refer to the area around this building, for example in the context of the housing market.

Tenants
 Embassy of Belize
 Embassy of Eswatini
 Embassy of Guatemala
 Embassy of Haiti
 Embassy of Marshall Islands
 Embassy of Nauru
 Embassy of Palau
 Embassy of Paraguay
 Embassy of Saint Kitts and Nevis
 Embassy of Saint Lucia
 Embassy of Saint Vincent and the Grenadines
 Embassy of Tuvalu
 Saudi Arabian Trade Office

2009 H1N1 case

On 15 June 2009 a female diplomat went to work inside the building after returning from a trip to the Americas. That afternoon, she felt uncomfortable and thus went home. On 16 June she was examined in the National Taiwan University Hospital and the day after it was known that the examination was positive for the Pandemic H1N1/09 virus. The story only went public after a delay, for which the Ministry of Foreign Affairs was widely criticized as trying to keep the news hidden, endangering the health of other people inside the building and the general public.

See also
 List of diplomatic missions in Taiwan

References

Government buildings in Taiwan
Foreign relations of Taiwan
Diplomatic districts